Miltochrista radians is a moth of the family Erebidae first described by Frederic Moore in 1878. It is found in India (Sikkim, Assam, Calcutta).

References

radians
Moths described in 1878
Moths of Asia